This page lists various subject rankings, including  QS University Subject Rankings, U.S. News & World Report, Times Higher Education World University Subjects Rankings and Academic Ranking of World Universities, of universities and colleges in Hong Kong. They adopt different ranking methodologies.

Abbreviation
HKU: The University of Hong Kong
CUHK: The Chinese University of Hong Kong
HKUST: The Hong Kong University of Science and Technology
CityU: City University of Hong Kong
PolyU: The Hong Kong Polytechnic University
HKBU: Hong Kong Baptist University
LU: Lingnan University
EdU HK: The Education University of Hong Kong

QS World University Rankings by Faculty

QS World University Rankings by Subjects (top 200)

U.S. News & World Report – Best Global Universities Rankings by Subjects

Times Higher Education World University Subjects Rankings 
The institution had ranked the top 50 universities in each of the six categories but was added to 100 in the latest 2013-14 league tables.

Academic Rankings of World Universities by Subjects (top 200)

References 

University and college rankings
subject rankings